Jandhyala Papayya Sastry (4 August 1912 – 21 June 1992) was an eminent Telugu writer and lyricist. He was popularly known as Karunasri because his writings expressively show compassion (Karuna or Kāruṇyam), one of the nine Rasas. His famous kavyas include Pushpa Vilapam and Kunthi Kumari.

Poetry is the tremendous reflection of integrated self-awareness of man and the suffering and maladies of society. Karunasri's “Udayasri” “Vijayasri” and “Karunasri” achieved the rarest and unique distinction innumerable reprints. The poet rightly described  ″Udayasri″ as his fragrant heart, ″Vijayasri″ as his thoughtful head and ″Karunasri″ as his valuable life. These three works of karunasri are the manifestation of satyam (Truth), Sivam (Goodness) and Sundaram (Beauty).

“Udayasri” takes us from darkness to twilight;
 
“Vijayasri” from twilight to light;

and “Karunasri” from light to delight – The bliss of god.

Poetry of Karunasri will take us to the melodious heights of spirituality and to the depths of maladies and sorrowful sufferings of present society and ultimately act as panacea of all ills. His poetry is the harbinger of peace, social purpose and human values and also an answer and solution for all social problems.

Karunasri is a strange combination of tradition and modernity, spirituality and social awareness and most of his poetry dances and endures on the lips of every one sweetly and serenely. He is popularly remembered and revered as a poet of great popularity only next to Bammera Potana, the poet of Mahabhagavata.

Brief life sketch
Papayya Sastry was born in Kommuru village, Pedanandipadu mandal, Guntur district in 1912. After primary and middle school education in his village.

Papayya Sastry has about 27 works, which include Pushpa Vilapam, Kunthi Kumari, Karunasri, Paaki Pilla, Udayasri, Vijayasri, Omar Khayyam, Aruna Kiranalu, Telugu Baala and Kalyana Kalpavalli. His Pushpa Vilapam was born out of his anger towards a visitor, who began eating the petals of a rose from the flower vase on the table, while the poet had been in his prayer room. Karunasri was born out of his stream of his thoughts when he visited the rare Buddhist sculpture, Mahachaitya and pillars at Amaravathi village, Guntur district. He saw the plight of a scavenger girl and wrote Paaki Pilla (1928) at the age of 16 years.  His compositions are timeless; they move the soul. The language is very simple and any common man with basic understanding of the Telugu language can easily understand the depth of his expression. Ghantasala rendered his Pushpa Vilapam and Kunti Kumari. The lyrics and Ghantasala's voice are said to make people cry with pity.

Papayya Sastry acted as Nandi Thimmana without wearing any make-up in Bhuvana Vijayam during Ugadi celebrations. He became a devotee of Satya Sai Baba and Viswaguru Viswamji during his later years.

Papayya Sastry was married to Anasuyamma. They had two sons and a daughter.

Parents: Mahalakshmi and Paradesaiah

Wife:	Anasuya Devi

Sons:	Dr. Jaya Krishna Bapuji, M.A., Ph.D. (Spouse: Subhashini)
	Venkata Ramana M.Com, M.Ed. (Spouse: Varasri B.sc B.Ed.)

Daughter: Vijaya Lakshmi, M.A., B.Ed. (Ch. Nageswara Rao, M.A., M.Ed.)

Address:
	3-22-6, Kalyana Bharati,
Ravindra Nagar,
	Guntur- 522006

Education:
	Rashtra Bhasha Visarada 	1934
	Ubhaya Bhasha Praveena 	1936
	Hindi Bhasha Praveena	1940

Teachers:
	Sri Kuppa Anjaneya Sastry, Cherukur (Grammar)
	Sri Bhamidipati Subrahmanya Sastry, Mopidevi (Literature)
	Sri Jammalamadaka Madhavarama Sarma, Guntur (Rhetoric)

Profession as Teacher: Stall Girls High School, Guntur – 4 years, Sri RamaKrishna High School, Amaravati – 4 years

Profession as Lecturer:  A.C. College, Guntur – 22 years, Mahaveer College, Guntur – 3 years, Hindu College, Guntur – 2 years
	
Editor:
	Chief Editor, Potana Bhagavatam Project – T.T.D

Works Published

Bala Koteswara Tharavali 				(Poetry)			1934

Udayasri  (Part  I) 					(Poetry)			1944

ArunaKiranalu						(Lyrics)			1945

Karunamayi						(Drama)				1945

Vijayasri	(Based on Maha Bharat)			Poetry				1948

Ahimsa Jyothi	(Homage to Ghandhiji)			Compilation			1948

Karunasri  Part  I (Story of Boddha)			Poetry				1950

Veera Bharati						(Heroic Stories)		1950

Udaya Bharati 						Children's Text Book 		1950

Bharata Pratibha					Biographies		        1951

Charumitra						Playlet				1951

Tenugu Seema						Stories for Children		1952

Udayasri Part II					Poetry				1952

Kalayana Kadambari					Prose				1952

Prema Moorti						Prose				1953

Swanna Vasavadatta					Drama				1954

Ahimsa Jyothi						Novelette			1955

Mahati							Stories for Children		1955

Mandaramu						Stories for Children		1955

Kalyana Kalpavalli					Anthology of Old Poetry		1958

Bala Bharati						Stories for Children		1958

Guru Dakshina						Stories for Children		1958

Bangaru Padmam						Playlets			1959

Indra Dhanussu						Stories for children		1960

Chandamaamalo Kundelu					Stories for children		1960

Kalayan Dampatulu					Stories for children		1960

Telugu Baala						Moral Poems			1961

Srinivasa vachanam					children's text book		1961

Ganesa Pancha Ratnamaala				Compilation			1961

Saptarshi Ramayanam					Translation			1962

Pooja Pushpalu						Stories for children		1962

Naluguru Mitrulu					Novelette			1962

Simham Mechina Chitteluka				Stories for children		1962

Adrushtamichina Adbhuta Deepam				Novelette			1963

Sakuntala						Drama				1963

Vasantasena						Novelette			1963

Dwadasa Jyotirlinga Manimanjari				Compilation			1964

Adikavi vaalmiki					Stories For Children		1965

Tyaga Moorti - Part I					Story of Christ			1966

Tyaga Moorti - Part II					Story of Christ			1966

Damayanti						Novelette			1967

Sailaja							Stories for Children		1967

Udayasri Part III					Poetry				1968

Udayasri Part IV					Poetry				1969

Kalayana Kanaka Durga					Translation			1972

Srinivasodaharanam					Poetry				1973

Bangaru Mungisa						Stories for Children		1974

Matsya Yantram						Stories for Children		1975

Maha Veerudu						Novelette			1975

Udayasri Part V						Poetry				1979

Bhagirathudu						Novelette			1980

Kankanti Kavita Vaibhavam				Commentary			1980

Potana Bhagavatam					Commentary on I canto		1982

Bhagavata vaijayantika					Essays				1982

Prasanna Katha vipanchi					Commentary			1983

Ananda Lahari						Poetry				1986

Amar Khayam						Poetry				1987

Poola vaanalu – Tene Sonalu				Commentary			1987

Anuraga Lahari						Lyrics				1989

Sai Sudhalahari						Devotional Poems		1990

Bhavya Bharathi						Stories of Children		1990

Arsha Bahrathi						Stories of Children		1990

Purana Bharathi						Stories of Children		1990

Adarsha Bharathi					Stories of Children		1990

Kalyana Bharathi					Stories of Children		1990

Dalita Bharathi						Stories of Children		1990

Veera Bharathi						Stories of Children		1990

Viswa Bharathi						Stories of Children		1990

Pratibha Bharathi					Stories of Children		1990

Vinoda Bharathi						Stories of Children		1990

Chamatkara Bharathi					Stories of Children		1990

Upadesa Bharathi					Stories of Children		1990

Muddu Balasiksha					Text Book For Children		1991

Padmavati Srinivasam					Novelette			1991

Viswa Sandesa Lahari					Moral Poems			1991

Karunasri Part II	(Story of Buddha)		Poetry				1991

Titles

Papayya Sastry was awarded Honorary Doctorate from Sri Venkateswara University, Tirupati 12th Mar 1984.

Kavita Kala Nidhi	Awarded By Sahiti Sravanti, Rajole		5th Sep 1982.

Kavi Kulalankara		Awarded by N.K.V Peettam, Bapatla	17th Apr 1989

Awards
Telugu Akadamy Award			Madras			29th Apr 1985

Rasamayi Award				Hyderabad		27th Jun 1987

Abinandana Award			Hyderabad		21st Sep 1987

Subhangi Award				Hyderabad		27th Jan 1989

Abhiruchi Award				Ongole			9th Apr 1989

Nalam Krishnaraya Award			Bapatla			17th Apr 1989

Sindhuja Award				Secunderabad		8th Nov 1989

Dr.Paidi Lakshmaiah Award		Hyderabad		24th Jun 1989

Mahamantri Madanna Award		Hyderabad		16th Mar 1990

Yarlagadda Ranganayakulu Award		Madras			26th Oct 1990

Dr. Burgula Rama Krishna Rao Award	Hyderabad		13th Mar 1991

Memorable Events

Editor for illustrated literary monthly  “subhashini”				1951 – 1953

Participated in All India Poets Conference, New Delhi			24th Jan 1961

Divine felicitation by Bhagavan Sri Satya Sai Baba, Puttaparti		25th Sep 1972

Special Member – Andhra Pradesh Sahitya Akademi, Hyderabad		29th Jan 1977

Felicitation with Gold Flowers and Gold Bracelet, Vijayawada		27th Jun 1982

Andhra Pradesh Sahitya Akademi Award 				30th Jan 1983

Men of letters Fellowship – Cultural affairs					1st Apr 1984

Honoring By President of India, Sri Gnani Jail Singh			25th Apr 1987

Releasing function of 50th edition (Golden jubilee) of  “Udayasri”,
And 25th edition (Silver Jubilee) of “Vijayasri” and “Karunasri” by Hon. Andhra Pradesh Chief minister Sri N.T. Ramarao 	27th Jun 1987

An appreciation in the Half yearly Magazine “Chitanya Kavita”		1st Apr 1990

More than 1.25.000 Copies of “Telugu Bala” Book were sold.
More than 50,000 Copies of “Udayasri” Ist Part were sold.
More than 25,000 Copies of “Vijayasri” were sold.
More than 25,000 Copies of “Karunasri” were sold.

The Poems Pushpa vilapam, Kunti kumari and ananda lahari were translated into English and Hindi by Dr. Amarendra and Dr. P. Surya Naraya Bhanu respectively

Delivered thousands of literary lectures throughout India.

Advaita Murthy, Sandhyasri, Pushpa vilaapam, Kunti kumari, Anjali, Karunamayi and Prabhati poems were sung by Ghantasala, and melodious music by H.M.V

Divine felicitation by Sri Viswayogi Viswamji on 6th Aug 1988 at guntur, to celebrate the completion of 60 years of literary endeavor.

Review along with cover page photo in the monthly magazine “Pathasala” on 1st Nov 1988

The director Rajaji made a Video film on “Pushpa Vilapam” on 16th Mar 1990

Honoring by Telugu University Hyderabad for “Amar Khayam” on 17th Apr 1990

Honoring by prof. C. Narayana Reddy on his 60th birthday celebrations on 26th Jul 1991

Honoring by Minister of Education, A.P, Sri P.V. Ranga Rao for his book Purana Bharathi on 8th Sep 1991

Several times acted as Mukku Timmana in Bhuvana vijayam, Nannaya in Bharatavataranam, Chemakura Venkata kavi in Indira Mandiram, and Potana in Brahma Sabha.

Literary Criticism and Research on his works

Smt. P. Sarojini devi did research on the topic “Vijayasri Paryalokanam” and got Masters in Philosophy
from Nagarjuna university in 1979.

Sri D.S.V Subrahmanyam did research on the topic “Karunasri Krutula Samagra Pariseelanam” and got Doctorate (Ph.D) from Banaras Hindu University in 1980

Sri G.A.N Raju did research on the topic “Karunasri Kavyanuseelanam” and got Masters in Philosophy
from Andhra university in 1983.

Dr. R. Surya Narayan Murty wrote a special book entitled “ Karunasri Kavya Samiksha” in 1955

Sri G. Prakasa Rao wrote a special book entitled “Karunasri Kavitasri” in 1974

The members of Ramaraja Bhushana Sahitya Parishat, bhimavaram compiled a souvenir on Karunasri entitled “akshropaharam” in 1988

Dr. J. Suman Babu wrote a special research book entitled “Karunasri Kavita Sowrabham” in 1990

Prof. Divakarla Venkatavadhani, Prof. Siva Sankara Swamy,  Prof. Bayya Surya Narayana, Prof. Gandham Appa Rao,  Dr.Nanduri Rama Krishnamacharya, Dr. Amarendra, Dr.P.Surya Narayana Bhanu, Dr. Dasarathi, Dr.P.G. Krishna Murty, Dr. K. Rama Mohana Roy,  Sri Sphurthisri, Sri Y. Balarama Murthy,
Sri. Srivatsava, Sri Mahantaiah, Sri G.N. Murty, Sri Pulicherla Samba Siva Rao, Sri Nagalla Gurna Prasada Rao, Sri Gali Nasara Reddy, Sri Mannav Giridhara Rao, Sri P.V.S. Patro, Sri P. Nageswara Rao, Sri Sikhamani, Sri Supani, Sri Seerapani, Sri M.K. Sugam Babu, Sri Smitasri, Sri Mohan, Sri B. Mastan Rao, Sri Y. Jaganmohan Rao, Smt. Ch. Bhavani Devi, Smt Lata etc., written articles in Telugu,English and in Hindi by appreciating Karunasri's work.

Opinions of Contemporary Literary Luminaries

Dr. Karunasri is a wizard who molded the poem as a word, as a song, as a saying and as an inspiration. He is perfect gentleman with compassion in his eyes and lyricism in his poetry. The very fact that his “Udayasri” had more than 50 reprints is sample proof of his great capabilities.

						- GnyanaPeetta Prof. C. Narayana Reddy

Karunasree is famous for his lucid, sweet style of expression. Udayasri is his magnum opus.

- Dr. Papineni Sivasankar, Sahitya Akademi Awardee

He created in Telugu poetry, a peculia style of his own, excusing classical splendor  and lyrical sweetness. His works like Udayasri, Vijaytasri and Karunasri are monumental contributions to Telugu Literature.

					- KalaPrapurna Madhunapantula Satya Narayana Sastry

The poems of Udayasri will live in Telugu Literature as long as Telugu is spoken in this land, and as long as Krishna, Godavari, Tungabadra and Suvarnamukhi rivers flow in this land.

					- Dr. Nanduri Rama Krishnamacharyulu

Karunasri is the only poet who reflects the pulse of the Telugu people in his poetry after the great Bammera Potana.
							
						- Prf. B. Rama Raju

To tell in a nutshell  karunasri is the twilight ray of romantic poetry. He is emperor of sweet words that dance on the lips of the andhra people. He is a classical genius who showed that poetry springs from the union of music and literature.

-	Guntur Seshendra Sharma

The Poetical works of karunasri were not written by mere words but by poetry itself. They are an index of turmoil of man.

-	Dr. Sanjiva Dev

Among contemporary poets Dr. Karunasri belongs to top rank. His poetry reflects the compassion of buddhism and self enlightenment.

							- Prof. S. V. Joga Rao

His contemplative poetry is enchant and enticing. - Prof. T. Donappa
The wonderful pen of Karunasri is dipped in ambrosia.
				
- Chief minister of Andhra Pradesh, Padmasri Dr. N.T. Rama Rao

The poetry of Dr.Karunasri is as heart moving as the melodious rendering of his songs by Ghantasala, the Ghandarva Gayaka.
				
					- Padama Bhushana Dr. Akkineni Nageswara Rao
	
The very fact that I have named my daughters as Vijayasri and Udayasri reveals the deep impression of his works on me.

-	Dr. Gummadi Venkateswara Rao
Simplicity, Tenderness and Pleasantness are the natural ornaments of his poetry

-	Dr. Devula Palli Ramanuja Rao

He is an emperor among modern andhra poets. His works are musical.

-	Dr. Utukuri Lakshmi Kantamma

The Golden jubilee of Udayasri is a golden chapter in Telugu literature. He has illuminated the Telugu poetical world with his poetical rays.

							- Dr. Prasada Raya Kulapati

His Udayasri is a pole star of his inimitable style in the modern Telugu poetry.

							- Dr. Amarendra

In this age the 50th reprint of his Udayasri can gauge where the novel is reigning the glamour of his poetry.

-	Dr. S. V. Bhujangaraya Sarma

References

 www.karunasri.net

External links
 Some of the poems of Karunasree in English script.
 

1912 births
1992 deaths
Telugu-language lyricists
Poets from Andhra Pradesh
People from Guntur
20th-century Indian poets